Felix Barajas (born January 24, 2003) is an American soccer player who plays as a winger for Duke Blue Devils.

Club career

LA Galaxy
Born in the North Hills neighborhood in Los Angeles, California, Barajas began his career in the youth setup of Major League Soccer club LA Galaxy. After rising the ranks of the academy, Barajas was called into the first team for a pre-season friendly against the New England Revolution on March 30, 2021. Barajas made his senior debut in the match and scored the equalizing goal for the Galaxy in the 28th minute to make it 1–1.

On April 30, 2021, Barajas made his first appearance for Galaxy's USL Championship affiliate LA Galaxy II against Sacramento Republic from the bench but did not come onto the pitch. On May 14, 2021, Barajas made his professional debut for LA Galaxy II against Real Monarchs, coming on as a late substitute in the 2–0 victory.

College
In fall of 2021, Barajas began playing college soccer at Duke University.

Career statistics

Club

References

External links
 Profile  at U.S. Soccer Development Academy

2003 births
Living people
American soccer players
Association football midfielders
LA Galaxy II players
USL Championship players
Soccer players from Los Angeles
Duke Blue Devils men's soccer players